Langgar is a mukim in Kota Setar District, Kedah, Malaysia. The Kedah royal mausoleum is located here. The nation's founding father and the first Prime Minister, Tunku Abdul Rahman, was laid to rest in this royal mausoleum.

Hospital Sultanah Bahiyah, Kedah's and northern Peninsular Malaysia's main tertiary referral centre, is located in the town. SJK(C) Tai Chong is also located here.

Kota Setar District
Mukims of Kedah